Mark Burton (born 18 May 1974) is a retired association football player who represented the New Zealand national team at international level. He played as an attacking midfielder.

Club career 
As a teenager, Burton was recommended to SV Werder Bremen by compatriot and New Zealand football legend Wynton Rufer who played for Bremen at the time. After spending several years in their youth and amateur sides, he moved to lower division teams VfL Osnabrück, Kickers Emden and VfB Lübeck before returning to New Zealand.

International career 
Burton played for the New Zealand national team collecting 27 caps and six goals in official FIFA internationals between 1996 and 2003. He twice played at the FIFA Confederations Cup and also twice at the OFC Nations Cup. At the 2002 OFC Nations Cup in Auckland, the Most Valuable Player of the Tournament Award was presented for the first time, with Burton being deemed the best player of the tournament.

References

External links
 Mark Burton Interview
 Burton lift for Kingz on road up ladder
 
 

1974 births
Living people
Association footballers from Wellington City
New Zealand association footballers
Association football midfielders
New Zealand international footballers
1998 OFC Nations Cup players
1999 FIFA Confederations Cup players
2000 OFC Nations Cup players
2002 OFC Nations Cup players
2003 FIFA Confederations Cup players
National Soccer League (Australia) players
Football Kingz F.C. players
VfB Lübeck players
SV Werder Bremen II players
VfL Osnabrück players
Kickers Emden players
New Zealand expatriate association footballers
New Zealand expatriate sportspeople in Germany
Expatriate footballers in Germany